Kerwin Waldroup (born August 1, 1974) is a former professional American football player who played defensive end for three seasons for the Detroit Lions. He  initially played college football at University of Michigan before transferring and finishing at Central State University in Wilberforce, Ohio. He is a graduate of Rich Central High School. Following his football career, he served jail time for child abuse.

Career
Waldroup was born on August 1, 1974, in Country Club Hills, Illinois. He was a member of the 1992, 1993 and 1994 Michigan Wolverines, wearing the number 59. He recorded no stats in 1992, and only one tackle in 1993. In 1994, he posted a total of 32 tackles including 10 against Illinois on October 22 and 8 against Colorado in The Miracle at Michigan. The final game in which he recorded any stats for Michigan was on October 29, 1994 against Purdue. He is not credited with earning a varsity letter in any season at Michigan.  In the week after the Purdue game, Waldroup told Michigan's coaches that he was quitting the team.  Head coach Gary Moeller delayed announcing Waldroup's departure until early November, in hopes that Waldroup would reconsider.  Moeller told reporters that "academics may have played a part in Waldroup's decision."

Waldroup recorded 69 solo tackles and five quarterback sacks in his three-year career in the National Football League. He had a career-high six tackles in three games, including back-to-back games in October for the 1996 Detroit Lions.

Post football
In December 2006, Waldroup was faced with four charges of false imprisonment, child abuse and depriving a victim of a phone. He allegedly held his girlfriend, Sheri Amos, and her children ages 10, 13 and 16 for two days at a Ramada Inn hotel near Interstate 95 in St. Augustine, Florida. He pleaded no contest to child abuse and was sentenced to six months in jail to be followed by 2 years of probation.

Notes

1974 births
Living people
Sportspeople from Cook County, Illinois
Players of American football from Illinois
American football defensive ends
Central State Marauders football players
Detroit Lions players
Michigan Wolverines football players
People from Country Club Hills, Illinois